Cynthia Holscher (born April 26, 1969) is an American politician who served in the Kansas House of Representatives from the 16th district from 2017 to 2020, and was elected to represent the 8th district for the Kansas Senate starting in 2021.

Political career 
In 2016, Holscher ran for election to represent District 16 in the Kansas House of Representatives, and defeated Republican incumbent Amanda Grosserode. She won re-election in 2018.

Holscher was elected to represent district 8 in the Kansas Senate on November 3, 2020.

Electoral record

References

1969 births
Living people
21st-century American politicians
21st-century American women politicians
Politicians from Overland Park, Kansas
University of Missouri alumni
Women state legislators in Kansas
Democratic Party members of the Kansas House of Representatives